The Colobinae or leaf-eating monkeys are a subfamily of the Old World monkey family that includes 61 species in 11 genera, including the black-and-white colobus, the large-nosed proboscis monkey, and the gray langurs. Some classifications split the colobine monkeys into two tribes, while others split them into three groups. Both classifications put the three African genera Colobus, Piliocolobus, and Procolobus in one group; these genera are distinct in that they have stub thumbs (Greek κολοβός kolobós = "docked"). The various Asian genera are placed into another one or two groups. Analysis of mtDNA confirms the Asian species form two distinct groups, one of langurs and the other of the "odd-nosed" species, but are inconsistent as to the relationships of the gray langurs; some studies suggest that the gray langurs are not closely related to either of these groups, while others place them firmly within the langur group.

Characteristics 

Colobines are medium-sized primates with long tails (except for the pig-tailed langur) and diverse colorations. The coloring of nearly all young animals differs remarkably from that of the adults.

Most species are arboreal, although some live a more terrestrial life. They are found in many different habitats of different climate zones (rainforests, mangroves, mountain forests, and savannah), but not in deserts and other dry areas. They live in groups, but in different group forms.

Colobines are folivorous, though their diet may be supplemented with flowers, fruits and the occasional insect. To aid in digestion, particularly of hard-to-digest leaves, they have multichambered, complex stomachs, making them the only primates with foregut fermentation. Foregut fermenters use bacteria to detoxify plant compounds before reaching the intestine, where toxins can be absorbed. Foregut fermentation is also associated with higher protein extraction and efficient digestion of fiber; it is the dominant form of digestions in diverse herbivore taxa, including most Artiodactyla (e.g., deer, cattle, antelope), sloths, and kangaroos. In contrast, lower diversity howler monkeys in the New World rely on hindgut fermentation – occurring lower in the colon or cecum – much like horses and elephants. Unlike the other subfamily of Old World monkeys, the Cercopithecinae, they do not possess cheek pouches.

Gestation averages six to seven months. Young are weaned at about one year and are mature at three to six years. Their life expectancy is approximately 20 years.

Classification 
Colobinae is split into two tribes: Colobini, found in Africa, and Presbytini, found in Asia. Based on fossil records, the tribes split between 10 and 13 million years ago. The Colobini tribe contains three genera, black-and-white colobuses, red colobuses, and the olive colobus, all of whom are found in Africa. The Asian Presbytini comprises seven genera split into two clades, the odd-nosed group and the langur group.

 Family Cercopithecidae
 Subfamily Cercopithecinae
 Subfamily Colobinae
 Tribe Colobini
 Genus Colobus - black-and-white colobus monkeys
 Genus Piliocolobus - red colobus monkeys
 Genus Procolobus - olive colobus
 Genus Cercopithecoides
 Tribe Presbytini
 Langur (leaf monkey) group
 Genus Trachypithecus - lutungs
 Genus Presbytis - surilis
 Genus Semnopithecus - gray langurs
 Odd-nosed group
 Genus Pygathrix - doucs
 Genus Rhinopithecus - snub-nosed monkeys
 Genus Nasalis - proboscis monkey
 Genus Simias - pig-tailed langur
 Genus Mesopithecus

Hybrids
Intergeneric hybrids are known to occur within the subfamily Colobinae. In India, gray langurs (Semnopithecus spp.) are known to hybridize with Nilgiri langurs (Trachypithecus johnii).

References

 
Mammal subfamilies
Taxa named by Thomas C. Jerdon
Taxa described in 1867